Kondom may refer to:
 Teruo Kakuta, pen name Kondom, Japanese manga artist
 Kondom Agaundo, Papua New Guinean tribal leader and politician

See also 
 Condom (disambiguation)
 Kondon (disambiguation)
 Kondoma